Hanna Nilsson (born 16 February 1992) is a Swedish racing cyclist, who rides for UCI Women's Continental Team . She has competed in the road race at the UCI Road World Championships on nine occasions, between 2012 and 2022.

Major results
Source:

2015
 National Road Championships
3rd Time trial
3rd Road race
2017
 2nd Overall Tour Cycliste Féminin International de l'Ardèche
1st  Mountains classification
 2nd Giro del Trentino Alto Adige-Südtirol
 National Road Championships
3rd Time trial
3rd Road race
 6th Giro dell'Emilia Internazionale Donne Elite
 7th Overall Gracia–Orlová
 8th La Classique Morbihan
 9th Ljubljana–Domžale–Ljubljana TT
 10th La Course by Le Tour de France
2018
 6th Giro dell'Emilia Internazionale Donne Elite
 8th Durango-Durango Emakumeen Saria
 8th Grand Prix de Plumelec-Morbihan Dames
 10th Overall Tour Cycliste Féminin International de l'Ardèche
2019
 National Road Championships
2nd Road race
3rd Time trial
 7th Overall Women's Tour of Scotland
 8th Overall Gracia–Orlová
 9th Donostia San Sebastian Klasikoa
 10th Overall Ladies Tour of Norway
2021
 3rd Time trial, National Road Championships
2022
 5th Grand Prix du Morbihan Féminin

References

External links

1992 births
Living people
Swedish female cyclists
People from Kristianstad Municipality
Sportspeople from Skåne County
21st-century Swedish women